Gymnastics will be contested at the 2011 Summer Universiade from August 13 to August 22 at the Bao'an District Gym (artistic and rhythmic competitions) and the Futain Sports Park Gym (aerobic competitions) in Shenzhen, China. In artistic gymnastics, team, individual all-around, and individual events were held for both men and women. In rhythmic gymnastics, individual and group competitions were held. In aerobic gymnastics, mixed pairs, trios, group, aero-dance, and aero-step competitions were held.

Medal summary

Medal table

Artistic Gymnastics
The artistic gymnastics competition will be contested from August 13 to August 16.

Men's Events

Women's Events

Rhythmic Gymnastics
The rhythmic gymnastics competition will be contested from August 20 to August 22.

Individual

Group

Aerobic
The aerobic gymnastics competition will be contested from August 20 to August 22.

References

2011 in gymnastics
2011 Summer Universiade events
Gymnastics at the Summer Universiade